The play-off first legs were played on 12–14 November 1999, while the second legs were played on 16–17 November 1999 and 29 March 2000. Winners of play-off round qualified to the championship played following year in May and June, where Slovakia was chosen to host the fixtures.

Matches

|}

First leg

Second leg

2–2 on aggregate, Turkey won on away goals rule.

Spain won 7–1 on aggregate

Slovakia won 4–1 on aggregate

Croatia won 3–2 on aggregate

Czech Republic won 3–1 on aggregate

Netherlands won 4–2 on aggregate

Italy won 3–2 on aggregate

The match was played as a single leg at neutral venue due to the political tensions in Yugoslavia.

References

External links
 Play-offs at UEFA.com

Play-offs
Play-offs
2000